In statistics, a matrix gamma distribution is a generalization of the gamma distribution to positive-definite matrices. It is a more general version of the Wishart distribution, and is used similarly, e.g. as the conjugate prior of the precision matrix of a multivariate normal distribution and matrix normal distribution.  The compound distribution resulting from compounding a matrix normal with a matrix gamma prior over the precision matrix is a generalized matrix t-distribution.

This reduces to the Wishart distribution with 

See also 
 inverse matrix gamma distribution.
 matrix normal distribution.
 matrix t-distribution.
 Wishart distribution.

Notes

References
 Gupta,  A. K.;  Nagar, D. K. (1999) Matrix Variate Distributions, Chapman and Hall/CRC 

Random matrices
Continuous distributions
Multivariate continuous distributions